John Richard Harris (born June 13, 1952) is an American professional golfer who played on the PGA Tour and the Champions Tour.

Early life and amateur career 
Harris was born in Minneapolis, Minnesota and grew up in Roseau, Minnesota. He attended the University of Minnesota where he distinguished himself in both golf and hockey. Harris was the second-leading scorer on his 1974 hockey team that went on to win the national championship. In addition, his brother Robbie was a talented hockey player and played for the U.S. ice hockey team at the 1976 Winter Olympics.

In the spring of 1974, Harris won the individual Big Ten championship in golf. In the summer, he also won the 1974 Minnesota State Amateur.

Professional career 
Harris played minor league hockey after college and then became a professional golfer in 1975. He earned playing privileges for the PGA Tour at Fall 1975 PGA Tour Qualifying School graduates. Harris did not have much success on the PGA Tour, however, his best finish being T-26 at the 1976 Hawaiian Open.

Re-instated amateur career 
Harris regained his amateur status in 1983 and soon became one of the dominant players on the amateur circuit in Minnesota. He won the Minnesota State Amateur three additional times during this era. He also won the Minnesota State Mid-Amateur five times and the 1993 U.S. Amateur at the age of 41. During this era, he also won the Minnesota State Open back-to-back in 1994 and 1995 while still an amateur.

Second professional career 
After turning 50 in June 2002, Harris began his second professional golf career. His first win during this era, came in his fifth Champions Tour season at the 2006 Commerce Bank Championship. 

Harris took over as director of golf at the University of Minnesota in July 2010 after the departure of Brad James. In December 2010, the Minnesota Daily published a report that Harris kept associate women's head coach Katie Brenny from coaching, traveling with the team, or recruiting while letting his son-in-law and former caddy, Ernie Rose, perform those duties under a different title. Harris resigned as director of golf in June 2011. In March 2014, Hennepin County Judge Thomas M. Sipkins awarded Katie Brenny $359,000 in a discrimination lawsuit related to her treatment by Harris and Rose while at the University of Minnesota.

Personal life 
Harris lives in Eden Prairie, Minnesota.

Amateur wins
1974 Big Ten Championship (individual), Minnesota State Amateur
1987 Minnesota State Amateur
1988 Minnesota State Mid-Amateur
1989 Minnesota State Amateur
1990 Minnesota State Mid-Amateur
1991 Minnesota State Mid-Amateur
1992 Minnesota State Mid-Amateur
1993 U.S. Amateur
1995 Sunnehanna Amateur
1997 Porter Cup
1999 Minnesota State Mid-Amateur
2000 Minnesota State Amateur
2002 Terra Cotta Invitational

Professional wins (3)

Regular wins (2)
1994 Minnesota State Open (as an amateur)
1995 Minnesota State Open (as an amateur)

Champions Tour wins (1)

Champions Tour playoff record (1–0)

U.S. national team appearances
Amateur
Walker Cup: 1993 (winners), 1995, 1997 (winners), 2001
Eisenhower Trophy: 1994 (winners)

See also 

 Fall 1975 PGA Tour Qualifying School graduates

References

External links

American male golfers
Minnesota Golden Gophers men's golfers
PGA Tour Champions golfers
Golfers from Minneapolis
American men's ice hockey players
Minnesota Golden Gophers men's ice hockey players
NCAA men's ice hockey national champions
People from Roseau, Minnesota
People from Edina, Minnesota
1952 births
Living people